Joseph Stein (10 April 1912 – 6 October 2001) was an American architect and a major figure in the establishment of a regional modern architecture in the San Francisco Bay area in the 1940s and 1950s during the early days of the environmental design movement. In 1952, he moved to India and in 1955 was tasked with the planning of Durgapur in West Bengal, India along with Benjamin Polk. He was commissioned with this task in order to facilitate the establishment of Durgapur Steel Plant later on in 1959 followed by the Durgapur Steel City and Township. He is noted for designing several important buildings in India, most notably in Lodhi Estate in Central Delhi, nicknamed "Steinabad" after him, and where today the 'Joseph Stein Lane', is the only road in Delhi named after an architect. He is also famous for being the architect of the scenic Indian Institute of Management Kozhikode's campus. The Government of India awarded him the fourth highest civilian award of Padma Shri in 1992. His works remain even more relevant in the modern context as need for sustainable and humane architecture is felt.

Biography
Joseph Allen Stein was born on 10 April 1912, in Omaha, Nebraska. He studied architecture at the University of Illinois, the École nationale supérieure des Beaux-Arts in Paris and the Cranbrook Academy of Art. He worked for Ely Jacques Kahn in New York and with Richard Neutra in Los Angeles, before establishing his own practice in San Francisco. In San Francisco, he designed modest homes in the California style, but also became increasingly interested in the issues of low cost housing. He was also an active member of the group known as Telesis, which sought to bring better design to the needs of the middle and working classes.

With the outbreak of the Korean war and the rise of McCarthyism in 1950, he felt the need to find a location where his talent as an architect could be more freely expressed, and so left the US, first to Mexico and then to Europe, and finally to teach at Bengal Engineering College (now Indian Institute of Engineering Science and Technology, Shibpur) outside Calcutta.

In 1952 he moved to India, and became head of the department of architecture at the Bengal Engineering College in Calcutta. He worked in New Delhi from 1955 onwards, starting with another American architect, Benjamin Polk and even after retirement in 1995, continued to design for the architecture firm he founded. Over the year, he brought in 'California modernism' to several buildings he designed in Delhi, including, the Ford Foundation headquarters and the India International Centre (IIC) (1962), United Nations Children's Fund (Unicef), the World Wide Fund for Nature, a conservatory within Lodhi Gardens, Gandhi-King Plaza, an open-air memorial in IIC, Triveni Kala Sangam at Mandi House, the American Embassy School and the Australian high commission in Chanakyapuri. Among his notable buildings outside Delhi was the Express Towers, the first high rise built in India, and at the time it was completed, the tallest building in South East Asia.

Several of his disciples went on to establish leading architectural firms and real estate development businesses; J. K. Jain (architect & real estate developer), Chairman at Dasnac Designarch; and Anuraag Chowfla and Meena Mani (architects), Principals at Mani & Chowfla, to name a few.

In 1993, Building in the Garden, a study of his work, by Stephen White, dean of the School of Architecture at Roger Williams University in Rhode Island was published. He was awarded the Padma Shri, India's fourth highest civilian honour, in 1992. He married Margaret Suydam in 1938. He died on 6 October 2001, at age 89 in Raleigh, North Carolina. He is survived by their sons David and Ethan.

Selected projects

 1940: "One Family Defense House" (with Gregory Ain), unbuilt
 1940: "Low-Cost House", unbuilt
 1947: Ladera Cooperative (with John Funk; landscape architect: Garrett Eckbo), Palo Alto, California
 1955: Planning of Durgapur, West Bengal, India along with Benjamin Polk. 
 1968: Indian Express Towers, Nariman Point, Mumbai, relandscaping of Lodhi Gardens, along with Garrett Eckbo.
 Several buildings in Lodi Estate, New Delhi, including the headquarters of the Ford Foundation, Unicef and the World Wide Fund for Nature, a conference centre called the India International Center (1959–62), and the India Habitat Center for housing and environmental studies.
 Indian Institute of Management Kozhikode campus, Kerala, India.
 Triveni Kala Sangam Arts centre, New Delhi, India.
 Several factories with roofs inspired by the domes used in traditional Indian architecture
 Kashmir Conference Center, India.
 1962 – General Education Centre, now Cultural Education Centre for Performing Arts Kennedy House Complex of Aligarh Muslim University, India. www.cecamu.in
 Four factories for Escorts Ltd., Faridabad, India
 American Embassy School, New Delhi, India.
 Delhi Public School, Gurgaon (now Gurugram)

References

Notes

 The architecture of Joseph Allen Stein in India and California, by Stephen White, Oxford University Press, 1993.
  The responsibility for environment: First address, 9 October 1962, by Joseph Allen Stein. University of California, College of Environmental Design, 1962.

External links
 Stein’s gone but his works live on at Times of India.

1912 births
2001 deaths
University of Illinois alumni
Cranbrook Academy of Art alumni
Recipients of the Padma Shri in science & engineering
20th-century American architects
American alumni of the École des Beaux-Arts
American emigrants to India
Modernist architects
Architecture in the San Francisco Bay Area
People from the San Francisco Bay Area
American architecture writers
American male artists of Indian descent
American male artists
Architects from Nebraska
20th-century American male artists